The men's 400 metre freestyle was a swimming event held as part of the swimming at the 1932 Summer Olympics programme. It was the sixth appearance of the event, which was established in 1908. The competition was held from Monday August 8, 1932 to Wednesday August 10, 1932.

Nineteen swimmers from ten nations competed.

Medalists

Records
These were the standing world and Olympic records (in minutes) prior to the 1932 Summer Olympics.

In the first heat Takashi Yokoyama set a new Olympic record with 4:53.2 minutes. He bettered this record in the first semi-final with 4:51.4 minutes. But in the final Buster Crabbe took the Olympic record with 4:48.4 minutes.

Results

Heats

Monday August 8, 1932: The fastest two in each heat and the fastest third-placed from across the heats advanced to the final.

Heat 1

Heat 2

Heat 3

Heat 4

Heat 5

Semifinals

Wednesday August 10, 1932: The fastest three in each semi-final advanced to the final.

Semifinal 1

Semifinal 2

Final

Wednesday August 10, 1932:

References

External links
Olympic Report
 

Swimming at the 1932 Summer Olympics
Men's events at the 1932 Summer Olympics